Founded in 1981, MTN Satellite Communications (MTN), formerly known as Maritime Telecommunications Network, was a privately held VSAT satellite service provider headquartered in Miramar, Florida, USA. MTN provided connectivity services to major cruise lines, including Carnival Corporation, Royal Caribbean International, Norwegian Cruise Lines and well as luxury yachts, oil rigs, government and military vessels, and commercial vessels. MTN was acquired by Emerging Markets Communications in 2015.

USS Scranton and Good Morning America 

On November 23, 2005 ABC's Good Morning America ran a segment called "Run Silent, Run Deep" which was broadcast live from the nuclear submarine USS Scranton (SSN-756) while it was moving. The submarine and the US Navy support vessel USNS Dolores Chouest were each equipped with a 1900 MHz high-gain microwave antenna and equipment. The people on board the submarine had cellular service via a CDMA picocell on board the support vessel. The cell was provided by Wireless Maritime Services, a joint venture between MTN and Cingular Wireless. The submarine transmitted the live video broadcast quality to the Dolores Chouest using bidirectional microwave radios. The cellular technology was used to support all of the live two-way communications between the studio in New York City and the submarine below the surface. All of the video and cellular traffic was up-linked via MTN's communications technology on board the Dolores Chouest.

MTN Government Services 
In 2009, MTN formed MTN Government Services (MTNGS), a subsidiary company headquartered in Leesburg, Virginia that specializes in integrated communications services for military and government agencies. The MTN government team work with soldiers in Afghanistan, non-government organizations (NGOs) for disaster relief and recovery efforts in areas such as Haiti, scientific research ships mapping the ocean floor for NOAA, and a host of other government agencies for mission-critical communication needs.

Emmy Award 
In January 2012, MTN was awarded the 2011 Technology & Engineering Emmy Award from the National Academy of Television Arts and Sciences (NATAS) in the category "Development of Integrated, Deployable Systems for Live Reporting from Remote Environments" for collaborating with NBC on the Bloom-Mobile to Broadcast First Live "On the Move" Coverage of Military Forces in Iraq. The concept of the Bloom-Mobile was inspired by Mr. David Bloom himself in order to deliver live coverage of U.S. military forces in Iraq in 2003. MTN's founder and CTO  Richard Hadsall, collaborated with Mr. Bloom and NBC over a 45-day period to design, build, commission and equip the vehicle with live television and satellite transmission equipment, allowing the Bloom-Mobile to send live, full-motion broadcast-quality video and audio as U.S. troops moved towards Baghdad. By securing a 200-watt stabilized 1.2-meter Ku-band antenna to the back of a custom-built Ford F450 4WD diesel truck, MTN enabled NBC to provide the first live "On the Move" broadcast coverage while traveling at speeds up to 70 mph. Since the Bloom-Mobile's launch, its presence in the broadcast industry continues to expand. The vehicle is used to cover a variety of stories including hurricanes and elections, and is leveraged by the U.S. government for both tactical and non-tactical applications.

Holmdel teleport 
The company solely owns and operates a teleport facility in Holmdel, New Jersey, USA. The facility is 10,000 sq. feet and supports transmission needs of government agencies, ISPs, television broadcasters, cable programmers, carriers, business television and radio. The Holmdel teleport has access to a variety of spacecraft, as well as the U.S. domestic arc serving the Pacific, Atlantic, and Western Indian Ocean regions. Holmdel is the only U.S. teleport connecting with IS at 359 degrees East Longitude.

Santander teleport 
The Santander teleport is a joint venture developed and completed by MTN and its technology partner, Erzia, a provider of VSAT maritime communications in Spain. The Santander teleport serves as a centralized gateway for MTN's VSAT communications with coverage over the Americas, Europe, and Asia. The facility is located in Santander, North Spain at 43°26’58.452’’N, 3°52’37.055’’W.

MTN Nexus 
In November 2012, MTN launched plans for a next-generation hybrid communications network, MTN Nexus. Connectivity and content demands on cruise operators, specifically, increase significantly as cruise passenger and crew communications requirements grow. This new network will deliver sophisticated computing, caching and security infrastructure to deliver connectivity and communications to a degree never realized before at sea and in port. MTN Nexus will bridge the gap between land-based and sea-based connectivity and content delivery to cater to today's always-connected passengers and crew.

Challenges and acquisition

Panasonic and MTN 
MTN and Panasonic teamed to launch a network for Airborne Communications and demonstrated capabilities with Lufthansaas in 2009. By 2012, Panasonic decided to create its own satellite network and abandon MTN services.

Loss of Royal Caribbean 
Royal Caribbean Cruise Lines left MTN in 2012 and partnered with Harris Corporation and O3B.

Carnival and lawsuit 
In 2013, MTN was limited Carnival Cruise Lines internet services after Carnival Cruise Lines decided to leave the telecom provider for Harris Corporation. In 2014, Carnival Cruise Lines ended the Lawsuit with MTN after settling the dispute. The two companies created a deal where Carnival Cruise Lines would retain TV and microwave broadband services with MTN while doing satellite communications with Harris.

Acquisition 
MTN was acquired by Emerging Markets Communications in 2015 for total cash consideration of $27.3 million plus the assumption of working capital liabilities and employee retention payments. The website for MTN Government Services (www.mtngs.com) was removed and redirected.

References

External links 
 

Communications satellite operators
Miramar, Florida